Mystified may refer to:

Mystified (EP), a 2017 EP by Joe Scarborough
Mystified (film), a 2019 Philippine fantasy film
Mystified, a 1997 album by Shahram Nazeri
"Mystified", a song on the 1987 album Dear Children by The Black Sorrows
"Mystified", a song on the 1987 album Tango In The Night by Fleetwood Mac
"Mystified", a song on the 2003 album Neon Nights by Dannii Minogue

See also
 Mystify (disambiguation)